Jeong Yeong-chong (born 24 June 1992) is a South Korean footballer who plays as forward for FC Namdong in K4 League.

Career
He signed with Jeju United in January 2015. He scored his debut goal for Jeju United against FC Seoul on 6 June 2016.

References

External links

1992 births
Living people
Association football forwards
South Korean footballers
Jeju United FC players
Gwangju FC players
FC Namdong players
K League 1 players
K League 2 players
Hanyang University alumni
Sportspeople from Incheon